Chalcosicya is a genus of leaf beetles in the subfamily Eumolpinae. It is mainly known from the West Indies, though one species is found in southern Mexico. It has recently been thought to be a sister genus to the Mediterranean Colaspidea, with Colaspina as a sister genus to the former two combined.

The genus was first erected by the American entomologist Doris Holmes Blake in 1930 for a single new species from Cuba. In subsequent publications by Blake, she described more than 20 additional species of the genus from various islands in the West Indies. In 2012, a species of Chalcosicya was described from southern Mexico by R. Wills Flowers, expanding the range of the genus to the mainland of North America.

Beetles in the genus are small in size (less than 4 mm) and have a robust, ovate body. They have a black, dark bronze, green or blue color, and are covered in scale-like hairs or setae.

Species

 Chalcosicya acuminata Blake, 1951
 Chalcosicya alayoi Blake, 1960
 Chalcosicya androsensis Blake, 1965
 Chalcosicya aptera Blake, 1951
 Chalcosicya constanzae Blake, 1951
 Chalcosicya convexa Blake, 1951
 Chalcosicya crotonis (Fabricius, 1792)
 Chalcosicya crotonis var. acuta Blake, 1951
 Chalcosicya crotonis var. angularis Blake, 1951
 Chalcosicya crotonis var. parguerensis Blake, 1951
 Chalcosicya crotonis var. septentrionalis Blake, 1951
 Chalcosicya darlingtoni Blake, 1951
 Chalcosicya ditrichota Blake, 1938
 Chalcosicya eleutherae Blake, 1951
 Chalcosicya farri Blake, 1966
 Chalcosicya fraterna Blake, 1951
 Chalcosicya gemina Blake, 1951
 Chalcosicya glabra Blake, 1951
 Chalcosicya grandis Blake, 1951
 Chalcosicya humeralis Blake, 1971
 Chalcosicya insularis (Blatchley, 1922)
 Chalcosicya maestrensis Blake, 1930
 Chalcosicya maya Flowers, 2012
 Chalcosicya nana (Suffrian, 1866)
 Chalcosicya parsoni Blake, 1951
 Chalcosicya parvula Blake, 1951
 Chalcosicya plana Blake, 1951
 Chalcosicya rotundata Blake, 1938
 Chalcosicya semicostata Blake, 1951
 Chalcosicya senilis Blake, 1951
 Chalcosicya setosella Blake, 1971
 Chalcosicya teres Blake, 1951
 Chalcosicya truncata Blake, 1951
 Chalcosicya villosa Blake, 1951

Synonyms:
 Chalcosicya costata Blake, 1938 is a synonym of Chalcosicya insularis (Blatchley, 1922)

References

Chrysomelidae genera
Eumolpinae
Beetles of North America
Insects of the Caribbean
Taxa named by Doris Holmes Blake